Hastings—Peterborough was a provincial electoral district represented in the Ontario Legislature from 1975 to 1999. It was located in the province of Ontario. This riding was created in 1975 from parts of Hastings and Peterborough East ridings. It was an approximate duplication of the federal electoral district of Hastings—Peterborough.

It was initially defined, federally, as consisting of the part of the county of Peterborough lying east of and including the townships of Anstruther, Burleigh, Dummer and Asphodel; and the part of the county of Hastings lying north of and including the townships of Rawdon, Huntingdon, Madoc and Elzevir.

In 1971, it was redefined (federal) to consist of the part of the county of Peterborough lying east of and including the townships of Anstruther, Burleigh, Dummer and Asphodel; and hat part of the county, together with that part of the county of Hastings lying north of a line described as commencing at the southwest corner of the township of Rawdon and following the south boundary of the said township, the south and east boundaries of the township of Huntingdon and the south boundary of the townships of Madoc and Elzevir to the east boundary of the said county.

The federal electoral district was abolished in 1952 when it was redistributed between Hastings—Frontenac and Peterborough ridings.

The provincial electoral district continued until the redistribution of 1999 when it was abolished, and the respective areas migrated into Peterborough, Northumberland—Quinte West West,
and Hastings-Frontenac-Lennox AND Addington electoral districts.

Members of Provincial Parliament

Provincial election results

References

Former provincial electoral districts of Ontario